The Maghreb owl (Strix  mauritanica) is an owl of the earless owl genus, Strix. It occurs in northwestern Africa from Morocco to Tunisia and Mauritania.  It was previously considered a subspecies of the tawny owl.

This species is a rather dark grey-brown with no evidence of morph colour variation. It is slightly dull, cooler and more uniform hue overall than Strix aluco aluco or Strix aluco sylvatica. Study of genetic materials, including phylogeography, and the species dispersal behaviour, supports the division of Strix aluco maurtanica from the European subspecies, and it may even form its own species, with the Strait of Gibraltar as a natural gap between the ranges. Although sometimes suggested as about 5% smaller than Strix aluco aluco, current data suggest it is of similar size to Italian nominate owls and Spanish Strix aluco sylvatica found on the other side of the Mediterranean.

References

Maghreb owl
Birds of North Africa
Maghreb owl